The National Health Service and Community Care Act 1990 (c 19) introduced an internal market into the supply of healthcare in the United Kingdom, making the state an 'enabler' rather than a supplier of health and social care provision.

Contents
The Act states that it is a duty for local authorities to assess people for social care and support to ensure that people who need community care services or other types of support get the services they are entitled to. Patients have their needs and circumstances assessed and the results determine whether or not care or social services will be provided. This also ensures that the people giving the care follow a certain set of rules called the care value base. Local authority resources can be taken into account during the assessment process, but if it is deemed that services are required, those services must be provided by law: services cannot be withdrawn at a later date if resources become limited.

The Act also split the role of health authorities and local authorities by changing their internal structure, so that local authority departments assess the needs of the local population and then purchase the necessary services from 'providers'. To become 'providers' in the internal market, health organisations became NHS trusts, competing with each other. Community care ensures that people in need of long-term care are now able to live either in their own home, with adequate support, or in a residential home setting.

It established GP Fundholding.

Finally, the Act made provision for the establishment of family health services authorities in place of family practitioner committees and for the establishment of NHS trusts.

See also
Care Act 2014
Care programme approach
National Health Service Act 1977 (c 49)
National Health Service Act 2006 (c 41)

References

Further reading
 Preface in  Quality of care: testing some measures in homes for elderly people, pp 12 – 18

United Kingdom Acts of Parliament 1990
NHS legislation